Yiaga Africa is a non-profit civic hub of change makers committed to the promotion of democratic governance, human rights and civic engagement. Yiaga Africa was launched as a student organization in 2007 at the University of Jos, Nigeria and has since established itself as a leading civil society organization in Africa. Since its inception, the organization has carved a niche for itself as one of Africa's frontline non-profit organization promoting participatory democracy, human rights and civic participation. With its operational base in Abuja, Nigeria, Yiaga Africa focuses on in-depth research, providing critical analysis on key democratic and governance issues, crafting practical solutions, training and empowering citizens to lead change in their community. Yiaga Africa implements several innovative programs aimed at stimulating active citizenship, protecting human rights and deepening democratic governance. We invest in building networks and social movements to drive social change and transformation. Yiaga Africa has leadership structures and members in all 36 states and 774 Local Government Areas (LGA) of Nigeria. Yiaga Africa is registered in Nigeria as an independent nonprofit organization. The nonprofit is the founder of a Nigerian movement to reduce the age of running for elective offices in Nigeria known as Not Too Young To Run, the movement have created global interest on youth political participation.

History
The nonprofit was established in 2007 as a student group at University of Jos, Plateau State by Samson Itodo and Cynthia Mbamalu. YIAGA is based in Abuja, Nigeria and has offices in Gambia, Ghana, Liberia, Nigeria and Sierra Leone.

Human Rights
In 2014, the organization launched a human right project known as ThumbItRight, focused on mobilizing young people to participate in electoral processes in Nigeria. Several young radio presenters and other youths were selected to propel the campaign. The project was funded by MacArthur Foundation.

Not Too Young To Run Movement
The Age Reduction Bill, also known as Not Too Young To Run bill was conceived by the nonprofit, with the goal to reduce the age for running for political office in Nigeria. It is a constitutional amendment which seeks to alter section 65, 106, 131, and 177 of the Nigeria constitution to reduce the age of running for house of assembly and house of representatives from 30 year old to 25 year old, senate and governorship from 35 year old to 30 year old and presidency from 40 to 30 and independent candidature in Nigeria. The nonprofit worked with other group of young leaders known as strategy team members and established state coordinators across Nigeria. The campaign is now global, symbolized by the hashtag #NotTooYoungToRun.

Monitoring the Presidential Election to Reduce Corruption
The nonprofit deployed 3,000 observer teams to 1,500 poling units to monitor the Nigeria's 2019 Presidential Election. They published a number of information during and after the election using their social media handles.

References

Organizations established in 2007